Kenneth C. Clatterbaugh is an American philosopher. He was Chair of the department of Philosophy at the University of Washington for fifteen years. He retired in 2012. His interests are modern philosophy, social philosophy, and gender studies, philosophy of religion. His latest book is a satirical look at some aspects of American Christianity. It is a novel, not an academic book although it contains considerable philosophical argument.

He graduated from University of Iowa in 1962, received the Wilson Fellowship following his graduation. He received his Ph.D. from Indiana University Bloomington in 1967.

Works (selection)

Books

Book chapters
Clatterbaugh, Kenneth (1992), "Are men oppressed?", in 
Reprinted in: 
 Clatterbaugh, Kenneth (1995), " Mythopoetic foundations and new age patriarchy", in

Articles

 (Causality before Hume.)

Articles online
www.menweb.org Whose Keepers, What Promises? (1995)

See also
American philosophy
List of American philosophers

References

External links
Homepage

Year of birth missing (living people)
Living people
University of Washington faculty
Indiana University Bloomington alumni
20th-century American philosophers
21st-century American philosophers
Men and masculinities scholars
University of Iowa alumni